Bart "Simpson" Bast (born 4 June 1967) is a former speedway rider from the United States.

Speedway career 
Bast became the United States champion in 1998 after winning the United States Individual Speedway Championship. He rode in the top tier of British Speedway in 1989, riding for the Swindon Robins.

Family
His cousins Mike Bast and Steve Bast were both North American champions.

References 

1967 births
Living people
American speedway riders
Swindon Robins riders